Tecwyn Lloyd Jones (born 27 January 1941 in Ruabon, Wales) is a former Welsh professional footballer who played for football league clubs Wrexham, Colchester United and Crewe Alexandra before moving into Welsh non-league football. He represented Wales at U23 level.

References

External links 
 
 Tecwyn Jones at Colchester United Archive Database

1941 births
People from Ruabon
Sportspeople from Wrexham County Borough
Colchester United F.C. players
Wrexham A.F.C. players
Crewe Alexandra F.C. players
Wales under-23 international footballers
Living people
Association football midfielders
Welsh footballers